The Calvary Reformed Church (previously called the Presbyterian Evangelical Fellowship) was founded in 1993 by pastor Nelson Owudo. There are 3 congregations in Kampala, Uganda. The church does not ordain women. The church adheres to the Apostles Creed and the Westminster Confession and Westminster Larger Catechism. Church government is Presbyterian.

References 

Presbyterian denominations in Africa
Presbyterianism in Uganda